Neumi Leweni (born 1957) is a Fijian Army officer and diplomat, who holds the rank of lieutenant colonel. He hails from the Lau Islands. He joined the Military in 1974 and by 2006 was one of two official spokesmen for the Military, the other being Lieutenant Colonel Orisi Rabukawaqa. In August 2007, he resigned to take up a diplomatic post, as Military attaché to China but has since rejoined the Military and returned from his diplomatic posting to serve with the RFMF.

Like other senior Military officers, Leweni was particularly outspoken in his opposition to certain policies and decisions of the Qarase government, including the early release from prison of persons convicted of offences relating to the Fiji coup of 2000. He also took a vocal stand against the controversial Reconciliation, Tolerance, and Unity Bill, which proposed to establish a Commission to compensate victims and pardon perpetrators of the coup. This, said Leweni, would undermine the rule of law and the integrity of the Military, as the Army could then be required to readmit soldiers convicted of mutiny.

As a spokesman, Leweni played a prominent role in the leadup and aftermath of the military coup of 5 December 2006.

References 

1957 births
Living people
People from Lau Province
Fijian diplomats
Fijian soldiers
I-Taukei Fijian people
Fijian expatriates in China